Ryden is a surname. Notable people with the surname include:

Folke Rydén (born 1958), Swedish journalist
George Ryden (born 1940), Scottish football player
Hope Ryden (1929–2017), American photographer, filmmaker and wildlife activist
Hugh Ryden (born 1943), Scottish football player
John Ryden (1931–2013), Scottish football player
Kalen Ryden (born 1991), American soccer player
Kent Ryden, Professor of American and New England Studies
Mark Ryden (born 1963), American surrealist painter, brother of KRK Ryden
Su Ryden, American politician (Colorado representative)
Susanne Rydén (born 1962), Swedish soprano
Vassula Rydén (born 1942), Egyptian-Swiss Christian mystic and author